Local elections were held in Lipa, Batangas, on May 13, 2013, within the Philippine general election. The voters will elect for the elective local posts in the city: the mayor, vice mayor, and ten councilors.

Mayoral and vice mayoral election
Incumbent Mayor Meynardo Sabili decided to run for reelection under the Liberal Party. He was elected as Mayor in 2010 defeating then incumbent Oscar L. Gozos despite his disqualification due to his residency. Sabili is from San Juan, Batangas, but it is stated in his certificate of candidacy that Sabili was a registered voter in Pinagtongulan. His running mate is councilor Eric Africa.

One of Sabili's opponents is the outgoing Vice Mayor Lydio Lopez, Jr.(running under the [United Nationalist Alliance])whose running mate is the Chairman of Barangay Antipolo del Sur and incumbent Liga ng mga Barangay President Marlon Luancing. Another opponent is the top councilor of Lipa (from the 2010 Elections), Merlo Silva running with incumbent three-time Lipa City councilor Avior Rocafort both under the party PMP (Pwersa ng Masang Pilipino) centering their platforms on the general masses or the marginalized populace of the city.

Candidates

Mayoral and vice-mayoral

Administration Coalition

Primary Opposition Coalition

City Council election
Voting is via plurality-at-large voting: Voters vote for ten (10) candidates and the ten candidates with the highest number of votes are elected.

Retiring and Term limited candidates as follow:
Merlo Silva-running for Mayor under Pwersa ng Masang Pilipino
Eric Africa-running for Vice Mayor under Liberal Party
Ralph Peter Umali-running for Vice Mayor under Nationalist People's Coalition
Avior Rocafort-running for Vice Mayor under Pwersa ng Masang Pilipino
Dy Pang Lim-running for Board Member of the 4th District of Batangas
Dominador Mauhay

Administration coalition

Primary opposition coalition

Results
The candidates for mayor and vice mayor with the highest number of votes wins the seat; they are voted separately, therefore, they may be of different parties when elected.

Mayoral and vice mayoral elections

City Council election
Voting is via plurality-at-large voting: Voters vote for ten (10) candidates and the ten candidates with the highest number of votes are elected.

|-bgcolor=black
|colspan=8|

References

External links
Official website of the Commission on Elections
 Official website of National Movement for Free Elections (NAMFREL)
Official website of the Parish Pastoral Council for Responsible Voting (PPCRV)

2013 Philippine local elections
Lipa, Batangas
Elections in Lipa
2013 elections in Calabarzon